Zahra Ben mime (born 30 September 1963) is an Iraqi-presenter and model. She is known for her role in Hera.

Early life
She was born in Baghdad to a Tunisian father from Sousse and an Iraqi mother from Al Diwaniyah. She lived in Baghdad until the age of six and then emigrated with her father to Damascus in Syria where she lived for thirteen years during which she completed her studies. In 2007, she emigrated to Tunisia where she began her professional career.

Career
She began her career as a model appearing in music videos and advertisements in 2009. In 2011, she became a presenter and producer working with Tunisian TV channels like El Watania 1 and Ettounsiya TV. In 2017, she turned to acting with her first role in the Tunisian TV series The Vortex. Her most prominent role was in the Iraqi TV series Hawa Baghdad which aired in 2019. She appeared with American actor Esser West, and won a Golden Crescent Award for best young Iraqi actress.

Personal life
Her husband is Tunisian, and the couple have three children (two sons and one daughter). She has a younger sister. She gained Iraqi citizenship in February, 2023. She participated in the Iraqi protests in 2019.

Works

TV series

TV shows

References

External links
 Zahra Ben Mime in IMDb

1989 births
Living people
Iraqi television actresses
Tunisian television actresses
Tunisian television presenters
Tunisian women television presenters
Tunisian television producers
Tunisian female models
Tunisian people of Iraqi descent
21st-century Iraqi actresses
21st-century Tunisian actresses
People from Baghdad